Andreea Ștefania Chițu (born 7 May 1988) is a Romanian judoka who competes in the women's 52 kg category. At the 2012 Summer Olympics, she was defeated in the second round by Ilse Heylen, having beaten Soraya Haddad in the first round. At the 2016 Summer Olympics, she beat Laura Gómez in her first match, before losing to Odette Giuffrida in the quarter finals.  Because Giuffrida reached the final, Chițu entered the repechage.  She was eliminated in the repechage by Érika Miranda.

References

External links
 

1988 births
Romanian female judoka
Living people
Olympic judoka of Romania
Judoka at the 2012 Summer Olympics
Judoka at the 2016 Summer Olympics
Judoka at the 2020 Summer Olympics
European Games gold medalists for Romania
European Games medalists in judo
Judoka at the 2015 European Games
Judoka at the 2019 European Games
20th-century Romanian women
21st-century Romanian women